Pheromone  is a chemical that triggers a social response in members of the same species.

Pheromone may also refer to
Pheromones (Animal Alpha album)
Pheromones (The Hard Aches album)
"Pheromone", song by Fler from Blaues Blut
"Pheromone", song by Prince from Come (Prince album)